The 2010-11 season was Dukla Prague's fourth consecutive season in the Czech 2. Liga. The club finished the season in first place, winning promotion to the Gambrinus liga. Dukla reached the top of the table after thirteen games, and stayed there for the rest of the season, maintaining an unbeaten record at home for the whole season.

Players

Transfers

In 
Over the summer, Dukla signed Radim Nečas from Mladá Boleslav and brought back Ondřej Vrzal on a year-long loan from Viktoria Plzeň.

In the winter transfer window, sixteen-year-old striker Patrik Svoboda joined from Kladno with six players going the other way on loan. Also joining Dukla at this time were two forwards: AC Sparta Prague's Martin Jirouš, who signed on a loan deal until 31 January 2012, and Jan Pázler from Slavia Prague. Goalkeeper Tomáš Kučera also arrived to provide backup for Rada. Martin Bayer left to join third league side Ovčáry and Robert Kokoška departed for Bohemians 1905.

Out 
In the summer, former national team striker Michal Kolomazník retired at the age of 33 with a career-ending knee problem. Veteran goalkeeper Martin Svoboda left after two seasons at the club. Striker Tomáš Kulvajt was released. Martin Macháček went out on loan to Sezimovo Ústí for the first half of the season.

In the winter, Dukla sent six players out on loan to SK Kladno as part of the deal for Patrik Svoboda. These players were Jakub Sklenář, Jakub Jakubov, Martin Macháček, Donát Laczkovich, David Radosta and Jaroslav Kmoch. Striker Pavel Vrána went out on loan to Karviná. Ukrainian forward Vadym Antipov, who had only managed one league appearance in the first 15 matches, transferred to FK Mažeikiai in Lithuania.

Statistics

Appearances and goals 

Starts + Substitute appearances.

|-
|}

Goalscorers

Disciplinary Record

Home attendance

Czech 2. Liga

Results by round

Results summary

League table

Matches

August

September

October

November

March

April

May

June

Cup 

Dukla reached the third round of the cup competition. This was the same progress as the club made in the previous season.

As a 2. Liga team, Dukla entered the Cup in the first round. After easing past amateur side Česká Lípa in their first match, Dukla travelled to fellow 2. Liga side Sezimovo Ústí. Despite conceding the first goal, Dukla ran out 3–2 winners.

In the third round Dukla faced Gambrinus liga outfit Jablonec. Despite opening the scoring through Dani Chigou, Jablonec managed to equalise and the match went to a penalty shoot-out. Even after the regular five attempts each, both teams missed the sixth penalty. Goalkeeper Filip Rada took the seventh and missed, but Jablonec striker Tomáš Pekhart made no mistake from the spot to put Jablonec in the next round and send Dukla out of the competition.

References

Cited texts

External links 
Official Website

Dukla Prague
FK Dukla Prague seasons